Ouled Bessa is a village in the Boumerdès Province in Kabylie, Algeria.

Location
The village is surrounded by Keddache River and the towns of Thenia and Zemmouri in the Khachna mountain range.

Notable people

References

Villages in Algeria
Boumerdès Province
Kabylie